Defender Association of Philadelphia is a non-profit corporation, based in Philadelphia, Pennsylvania, that provides defense on a court-appointed basis for criminal and delinquency cases in which the defendants and respondents are indigent adults and juveniles.

History 
In 1990, the association appointed the first woman as chief in 56 years. In October 2001, Firm changed its address. The site for Comcast Center (Philadelphia) at 17th Street at John F. Kennedy Boulevard, a site occupied by a building that housed the Defender Association of Philadelphia and a parking lot. In 2015, Keir Bradford-Grey become head of the Association.

Notable people 
C. Darnell Jones II, federal judge
Abbe Smith, law professor
Gregory M. Sleet, federal judge
Luis Felipe Restrepo, federal judge
Benjamin H. Read, politician

Scholarship 
 |Client Service in a Defender Organization: The Philadelphia Experience
 |egal Aid to Indigent Criminal Defendants in Philadelphia and New Jersey

References 

Criminal defense organizations
Legal aid in the United States
Organizations established in 1934
Government of Philadelphia
Crime in Philadelphia
Organizations based in Philadelphia